Streptomyces marinus is a bacterium species from the genus of Streptomyces which has been isolated from the sponge Haliclona sp. from the coastline from the city Tateyama in Japan.

See also 
 List of Streptomyces species

References

Further reading

External links
Type strain of Streptomyces marinus at BacDive -  the Bacterial Diversity Metadatabase

marinus
Bacteria described in 2010